Law in Asia refers to the legal systems of Asian countries.

History

Countries

 Law of Afghanistan 
 Law of Armenia 
 Law of Azerbaijan 
 Law of Bahrain 
 Law of Bangladesh 
 Law of Bhutan 
 Law of Brunei 
 Law of Cambodia 
 Law of China 
 Law of the People's Republic of China 
 Law of Hong Kong 
 Law of Macau 
 Law of the Republic of China(Taiwan) 
 Law of Cyprus 
 Law of East Timor 
 Law of Georgia 
 Law of India 
 Law of Indonesia
 Law of Iran 
 Law of Iraq 
 Law of Israel 
 Law of the Palestinian territories 
 Law of Japan 
 Law of Jordan
 Law of Kazakhstan 
 Law of North Korea 
 Law of South Korea 
 Law of Kuwait 
 Law of Kyrgyzstan
 Law of Laos 
 Law of Lebanon 
 Law of Malaysia 
 Law of Maldives 
 Law of Mongolia 
 Law of Myanmar 
 Law of Nepal
 Law of Oman
 Law of Pakistan 
 Law of the Philippines
 Law of Qatar 
 Law of Russia 
 Law of Saudi Arabia 
 Law of Singapore 
 Law of Sri Lanka 
 Law of Syria 
 Law of Tajikistan 
 Law of Thailand 
 Law of Turkey 
 Law of Turkmenistan 
 Law of United Arab Emirates 
 Law of Uzbekistan 
 Law of Vietnam 
 Law of Yemen

See also
 Legal systems of the world

Legal systems
Law in Asia